Mirko Vučinić (born 1 October 1983) is a Montenegrin former professional footballer who played as a forward.

Having caught the attention of Pantaleo Corvino, the sporting director of the Italian  club Lecce, he transferred there in the summer of 2000. He played for Lecce as they moved between Serie A and B. His highest-scoring season was 2004–05, with 19 goals in 28 games in Serie A. In 2006, he joined Roma, where he won the Coppa Italia twice; he later moved on to Juventus in 2011, where he won three consecutive Serie A titles. In July 2014, he moved to Al Jazira on an undisclosed fee.

On the international stage, Vučinić played for the Serbia and Montenegro under-21 team. Due to injury, he was unable to represent Serbia and Montenegro at the FIFA World Cup in 2006. Following the split of Serbia and Montenegro in the spring of 2006, Vučinić chose to represent his native Montenegro.

Quick, versatile, and physically strong, Vučinić was known for his creativity, technique, and intelligence as a footballer, as well as his powerful striking ability from distance.

In 2018, he began a golf career as a member of the Princess Milica Golf Club based in Tivat.

Club career

Early career
Vučinić started out at his hometown club Sutjeska Nikšić before being snapped up by Lecce in Italy during the summer of 2000 at age 16. The man who initiated the transfer was the club's sporting director at the time, Pantaleo Corvino, who has since developed a reputation for having a good eye when it comes to football talent coming out of Eastern Europe.

In his fourth season for the club, 21-year-old Vučinić scored 19 goals in 28 Serie A games, including a hat-trick versus Lazio on 1 May 2005. Following that successful season, his progress came to a halt with only nine goals recorded in 31 games as his career stalled due to injury.

Roma
On 30 August 2006, Vučinić signed a one-year loan contract with Roma worth €3.25 million, with an option of buying 50% of his registration rights from Lecce at the season's conclusion for an additional €3.75 million. Vučinić signed a 1+4 year contract, which worth €1.07M, €1.6M, €1.8M in the first three seasons in gross annually, then increased to €2.1 million in the last two seasons.

2006–07 season
During his first season in Rome, he did not feature much as he had operations on his left knee twice. Also, the presence of the European Golden Boot winner Francesco Totti as the lone forward of Roma's tactical formation under head coach Luciano Spalletti did not give Vučinić much playing time. Despite this, he succeeded in scoring three goals: his first goal for Roma in the 1–0 victory against Siena on 28 January 2007, his first goal in the UEFA Champions League during the quarter-finals match 2–1 victory against Manchester United on 4 April 2007. He also scored another Serie A away goal against Catania in a game that saw Roma beat the Sicilians 2–0.

2007–08 season
At the beginning of the 2007–08 season, Roma paid Lecce the pre-agreed price of €3.75 million to sign 50 percent of Vučinić's rights. He decided to wear the No. 9 jersey, previously owned by Vincenzo Montella in the last eight seasons, and also stated that he would like to do the same that Montella did at Roma.

As Francesco Totti was usually deployed as a lone striker, Vučinić began to play as left winger in Luciano Spalletti's 4-2-3-1. He scored his first goal of the season in the 2–1 victory against Sporting Clube de Portugal, in the Champions League group stage, allowing Roma to get the vital goal to earn them three points.

In the following game, away to Milan at the San Siro, with Francesco Totti injured, Vučinić started as a striker and scored a header, from a cross by his teammate Cicinho. It was the only goal of the game as Roma picked up a win over their rival. This proved decisive again, as in the game against city rivals Lazio, Roma won 3–2, with Vučinić leaving his mark with a left-foot equaliser and an assist for Simone Perrotta's goal. Another decisive goal of Vučinić was a header against Real Madrid at the Santiago Bernabéu, securing a 2–1 win for his side as well as qualification to the successive round.

2008–09 season
In June 2008, Roma finally bought Vučinić outright by paying Lecce €12 million, meaning Roma had paid €19 million in total to Lecce.

On 4 November 2008, he scored two goals in Roma's UEFA Champions League group stage match against Chelsea, emerging as 3–1 winners. Roma made it to the round of 16, where they lost to Arsenal on penalties, with Vučinić missing the target in the shootout with a weak shot down the middle that was easily saved by goalkeeper Manuel Almunia.

2009–10 season
On 1 June 2009, Roma announced Vučinić had signed a new four-year contract, under which the gross wage of the 2008–09 season would increase to €3.3 million as well as €4 million in 2009–10 season; €4.2 million in the 2010–11 season; €4.5 million in 2011–12 season and €4.7 million in 2012–13 season. The 2009–10 Serie A campaign started off poorly for Roma, forcing head coach Luciano Spalletti to resign after two opening losses. Arrival of new head coach Claudio Ranieri initially failed to change matters with the team continuing to slide down the standings. Vučinić was booed by Roma fans in early November 2009 against Bologna when he finally scored his first goal of the season. After winning that match, however, Roma went on a 24-match unbeaten run in the league, mounting a credible title challenge by the end of the season, in large part thanks to Vučinić's improved form and steady goalscoring efforts that included a hat-trick versus Udinese and a brace in the win against heated crosstown rivals Lazio.

2010–11 season
The 2010–11 season began well for Vučinić, scoring the injury-time winner against defending league champions Internazionale. As the season progressed, however, he experienced a loss of form and his goals output dipped dramatically. Later in the season he was linked with a move to Tottenham.

The team was also going through turmoil as it was way off pace for the title after challenging for the Scudetto the previous few seasons. Head coach Ranieri was sacked and replaced with Vincenzo Montella. Vučinić's form didn't improve much as his loss of confidence became very evident in April when he missed open net sitters in two consecutive home matches – first in Serie A versus Palermo with the score tied at 1–1 (Roma eventually lost 3–2), and then three days later in the Coppa Italia semi-final first leg versus Inter (Roma lost 1–0).

Juventus

2011–12 season
On 30 July 2011, it was confirmed that Juventus had signed Vučinić for €15 million from Roma, with a 4-year deal worth a reported €3.5 million [in net] per year. He scored his first goal for the club on 21 August 2011 in the 2–1 defeat to AC Milan in the annual Trofeo Luigi Berlusconi curtain raiser to the Italian season.

Vučinić scored a 32-metre goal in extra time to help Juventus to a 2–2 draw against Milan on 20 March 2012, helping his side to a 4-3 victory on aggregate and progression to the 2012 Coppa Italia Final.

2012–13 season
The second season of Vučinić started exceptionally well, proving to be a vital player at several occasions. His first Serie A goal came during his second appearance against Udinese on 2 September 2012, the end of the year came soon after and his goal tally stood at 4 goals on 14 appearances and 4 assists. On 9 January 2013 Vučinić scored in the 96th minute against A.C. Milan to bring Juventus to the semi-finals of Coppa Italia where they will face Lazio. The new year started very well for the Montenegrin, as he managed to score once again against Udinese.
Vucinic gained notoriety on April 5 when after scoring a penalty kick goal against Pescara, he celebrated by taking off his shorts and was publicly seen in his briefs.

2013–14 season
On 1 May 2014, in injury time of Juventus' Europa League semi-final elimination against Benfica, Vučinić was sent off for a fight with opponent Lazar Marković despite neither being on the field of play at the time, Marković having been substituted and Vučinić still on the substitutes bench.

Al Jazira
On 4 July 2014, Vučinić joined  UAE Arabian Gulf League side Al Jazira for an undisclosed fee believed to be in the region of €6 million. He enjoyed a first season of individual success, scoring 27 goals in 24 matches and finishing as top scorer of the league, but was troubled by injuries in the seasons following, amassing an additional nine appearances until his departure from the club in July 2017.

International career

Serbia and Montenegro
Vučinić played for Serbia and Montenegro's U21 national team and was later one of two Montenegro-born players chosen to play for Serbia and Montenegro at the 2006 FIFA World Cup (the other one being Dragoslav Jevrić). He had already been capped three times for the national team, but on 23 May 2006 he got injured and could not participate in the competition.

Montenegro
After Montenegro became an independent country on 3 June 2006, and a new national team was to be established, Vučinić initially opted to play for the Serbian national football team, but eventually decided to play for his native country. He earlier said, on 1 February 2006, in light of the possibility of a Serbian-Montenegrin union split, that "according to me, it is not a good idea". In a match against Croatia the same month, he shouted "Serbia" and showed the three-finger salute. However, in September 2006 in a press conference in Rome, he said, according to La Gazzetta dello Sport "I am hundred percent Montenegrin and happy that the union with Serbia has ended". He scored the first goal of Montenegro's history when he netted a penalty kick in the team's first international match on 24 March 2007, a 2–1 friendly win against Hungary. He has earned a total of 46 caps, scoring 17 goals. His final international was a June 2017 friendly match against Iran.

In 2010, in a game against Switzerland, Vucinic gained notoriety after he scored the game's only goal when he took off his pants and ran around with the shorts on his head, showing off his underpants.

Style of play
A quick, strong, talented, and technically gifted player that played with elegance and a perceived arrogance with his style of play, who is capable of both scoring and creating decisive goals for his team, Vučinić can fill any attacking position, but is often deployed as a winger on either flank, as a centre-forward, as a main striker, or even as a deep lying striker. Vučinić has drawn praise in the media for his vision, footballing intelligence, team play, and short passing accuracy, which him allow him to create chances for teammates, and also make him an effective assist provider; his positioning and intelligent offensive movement also enable him to provide depth for his team and create space for teammates, while his creativity, dribbling skills, touch on the ball, and close control, combined with his strong physique, allow him to retain possession under pressure, hold up the ball with his back to goal, and lay it off to his teammates. Due to his eye for goal, he is also well known for his ability to score powerful long range goals with both feet. In spite of his height, however, he is not particularly strong in the air. Due to the skill he demonstrated in his youth, he earned the nickname "the Balkan Maradona". Despite his talent, throughout his career he has also drawn criticism for his behaviour and unpredictability on the pitch, as well as his tendency to be inconsistent; his work-rate in big matches has also been brought into question at times with critics alluding to his "lazy" playing style, which often frustrated fans.

Career statistics

Club

1Includes Serbia and Montenegro Cup, Coppa Italia and UAE President's Cup

2Includes UEFA Europa League and UEFA Champions League

3Includes Supercoppa Italiana and Etisalat Cup

International

International goals
Scores and results list Montenegro's goal tally first.

Honours
Roma
 Coppa Italia: 2006–07, 2007–08
 Supercoppa Italiana: 2007

Juventus
 Serie A: 2011–12, 2012–13, 2013–14
 Supercoppa Italiana: 2012, 2013
Individual
 Montenegrin Footballer of the Year: 2006, 2007, 2008, 2010, 2011, 2012, 2013
 UAE Pro-League Top-scorer: 2014–15

Golf career
After serious injury that occurred while playing in the UAE, he played only two football matches (both of being a substitute in the National team), Vučinić started amateur golf career and participated in several competitions. In 2018, he started playing it professionally by registration as a player of Princess Milica Golf Club, based in Tivat.

References

External links

 
 Profile on AS Roma website

 
 World Cup 2006 Official Site – Upcoming Talents to Watch For
 UEFA U-21 Championship – Serbo-Montenegrin coach Okuka missing key players
 Mirko Vučinić profile, career timeline and detailed statistics
 
 
 

1983 births
Living people
Drobnjaci
Footballers from Nikšić
Association football forwards
Serbia and Montenegro footballers
Serbia and Montenegro under-21 international footballers
Serbia and Montenegro international footballers
Montenegrin footballers
Montenegro international footballers
Dual internationalists (football)
FK Sutjeska Nikšić players
U.S. Lecce players
A.S. Roma players
Juventus F.C. players
Al Jazira Club players
First League of Serbia and Montenegro players
Serie A players
Serie B players
UAE Pro League players
Serbia and Montenegro expatriate footballers
Expatriate footballers in Italy
Serbia and Montenegro expatriate sportspeople in Italy
Montenegrin expatriate footballers
Montenegrin expatriate sportspeople in Italy
Expatriate footballers in the United Arab Emirates
Montenegrin expatriate sportspeople in the United Arab Emirates